Aporias: Requia for Piano and Orchestra is an album of contemporary classical music by American composer and saxophonist/multi-instrumentalist John Zorn performed by Stephen Drury, the Hungarian Radio Children's Choir and the American Composers Orchestra.

Reception

The Allmusic review by Joslyn Layne awarded the album 3½ stars stating "the first three sections of this modern orchestral work are elusive, a crinoline fog of overtones emanating from various parts of the orchestra, be it the string section, or the boy sopranos of the Hungarian radio children's choir. The immediate opening lures you in with a few familiar quotes, but soon the composition heads into otherworldly passages, with an exploratory treatment," for, with "a range of bass drums, Eastern percussion hints, and interjections of orchestral warm-up moments," the "composition slips by in the shadows, remaining obscured even while enunciating.".

Track listing 
All compositions by John Zorn.
 "Prelude" - 6:40
 "Impetuoso" 3:31
 "Con Mistero" - 2:58
 "Languendo" - 2:33
 "Risentito" - 2:50
 "Freddamente" - 2:33
 "Religioso" - 2:04
 "Drammatico" - 4:52
 "Postlude"  4:21
 "Coda" - 0:49

Personnel 
 Stephen Drury – piano
 American Composers Orchestra conducted by Dennis Russell Davies
 Hungarian Radio Children's Choir

References 

1998 albums
Albums produced by John Zorn
John Zorn albums
Tzadik Records albums